Wallander may refer to:

TV, film, books
 Kurt Wallander, a fictional Swedish police inspector in novels by Henning Mankell
Wallander (film series), Swedish-language television films of the Wallander stories starring Rolf Lassgård
 Wallander (Swedish TV series), TV4 production starring Krister Henriksson
 Wallander (British TV series), BBC One production starring Kenneth Branagh
 Young Wallander, a Netflix production starring Adam Pålsson

People
 Arthur W. Wallander (1892–1980), New York City Police Commissioner
 Celeste A. Wallander (born 1961), American international relations expert